Poland competed at the 2018 Winter Paralympics in Pyongchang, South Korea, held between 7–16 March 2018.

Medalists

Alpine skiing

Men

Biathlon 

Men

Cross-country skiing

Men

Relay

Snowboarding

Men

See also
Poland at the Paralympics
Poland at the 2018 Winter Olympics

References

Nations at the 2018 Winter Paralympics
2018
Winter Paralympics